The Coinage Act 1971 is an Act of the Parliament of the United Kingdom which consolidated prior coinage-related enactments relating to the country's coinage. Among its provisions, the term legal tender was redefined and confirms that the Chancellor of the Exchequer is the Master of the Mint.

References

United Kingdom Acts of Parliament 1971
Financial regulation in the United Kingdom
Currency law in the United Kingdom